The boys' singles luge at the 2020 Winter Youth  Olympics took place on 18 January at the St. Moritz-Celerina Olympic Bobrun.

Results
The first run was held at 08:30 and the second run at 09:45.

References

Boys' singles